Tenzan Dam is a rockfill dam located in Saga Prefecture in Japan. The dam is used for power production. The catchment area of the dam is 0.8 km2. The dam impounds about 14  ha of land when full and can store 3270 thousand cubic meters of water. The construction of the dam was started on 1978 and completed in 1986.

References

Dams in Saga Prefecture
1986 establishments in Japan